Chrisman is an unincorporated community in Oak Run Township, Madison County, Ohio, United States.

Chrisman was never platted.  The Chrisman Post office was established on October 16, 1896, but was discontinued on October 31, 1901.  The mail service is now sent through the London branch.  As of 1915, the community contained little more than a few houses.

References 

Unincorporated communities in Madison County, Ohio
Unincorporated communities in Ohio